Mellachnus is a genus of tachinid flies in the family Tachinidae.

Species
Mellachnus velutinus Aldrich, 1934

Distribution
Argentina.

References

Diptera of South America
Endemic fauna of Argentina
Monotypic Brachycera genera
Exoristinae
Tachinidae genera
Taxa named by John Merton Aldrich